The following is a list of notable events and releases of the year 1956 in Norwegian music.

Events

May
 The 4th Bergen International Festival started in Bergen, Norway.

Deaths

 January
 27 – Harald Heide (79), violinist, conductor, and composer.

 December
 20 – Hildur Andersen (92), pianist and music teacher.

Births

 February
 28  –  Jens Wendelboe, jazz trombonist, composer, music arranger and orchestra leader.

  April
 29  –  Morgan Lindstrøm, artist, composer, and synthesizer-performer.

 June
 1  –  Stephan Barratt-Due, violinist and music teacher.

 July
 19  –  Marit Sandvik, jazz singer.

 August
 10  –  Lars Martin Myhre, composer, guitarist, pianist, folk singer, and record producer.

 September
 1  –  Hilde Hefte,  jazz singer, pianist, and composer.

 October
 9  –  Geir Langslet, jazz pianist and band leader.
 23  –  Svein Dag Hauge, jazz guitarist and record producer.

 September
 8  –  Eivin One Pedersen, jazz accordionist and pianist (died 2012).
 19  –  Eivind Aadland, orchestra conductor and violinist.

 November
 7 – Mikhail Alperin, Ukrainian born jazz pianist, member of the Moscow Art Trio, professor at the Norwegian Academy of Music (died 2018).
 8  –  Mari Boine, Sami singer and yoiker.
 15  –  Maj Britt Andersen, singer.

 December
 3  –  Rob Waring, contemporary music composer and performer (drums and vibraphone).
 9  –  Kari Bremnes, singer and songwriter.
 12  –  Geir Holmsen, jazz bassist, music arranger, and composer.

 Unknown date
 Kate Augestad, vocalist (Program 81/82).
 Ragnhild Berstad, contemporary composer.

See also
 1956 in Norway
 Music of Norway

References

 
Norwegian music
Norwegian
Music
1950s in Norwegian music